The 1979 All-Ireland Under-21 Football Championship was the 16th staging of the All-Ireland Under-21 Football Championship since its establishment by the Gaelic Athletic Association in 1964.

Roscommon entered the championship as defending champions, however, they were defeated in the Connacht Championship.

On 23 September 1979, Down won the championship following a 1-9 to 0-7 defeat of Cork in the All-Ireland final. This was their first All-Ireland title.

The final was refereed by Gerry Mc Cabe from Clonoe in Co Tyrone

Results

All-Ireland Under-21 Football Championship

Semi-finals

Final

Statistics

Miscellaneous

 The All-Ireland semi-final between Cork and Offaly is the first ever championship meeting between the two teams.
 The All-Ireland final between Cork and Down is the first ever championship meeting between the two teams.

References

1979
All-Ireland Under-21 Football Championship